Falmouth Bay is a body of water off the south coast of Cornwall, England, United Kingdom, with Rosemullion Head and Pendennis Point as its extremities. It separates the estuaries of Helford River (Helford) and River Fal (also known as Carrick Roads, with the harbours of Falmouth and St Mawes).

References

Bays of Cornwall